La Merced District may refer to:

 La Merced District, Aija in Ancash Region, Peru
 La Merced District, Churcampa in Huancavelica Region, Peru